Gran Canaria Arena, originally known as Palacio Multiusos de Gran Canaria, is an indoor sporting arena located in Las Palmas, Canary Islands, Spain. The arena, opened in 2014 by Mariano Rajoy, has a capacity of 11,470 spectators and is the home arena of CB Gran Canaria.

The first game in Gran Canaria Arena was the game of the 28th round of the 2013–14 ACB season between Herbalife Gran Canaria and FC Barcelona, played on 1 May 2014.

The arena hosted of the groups of the main round of the 2014 FIBA Basketball World Cup and the basketball's Copa del Rey in February 2015.

Attendances
This is a list of games attendances of CB Gran Canaria at Gran Canaria Arena.

See also
List of indoor arenas in Spain

References and notes

External links

Article on starting construction

Indoor arenas in Spain
Sports venues in the Canary Islands
Basketball venues in Spain
Buildings and structures in Las Palmas
Sport in Gran Canaria